Dmitry Kliger (born 14 April 1968) is a Russian sprinter. He competed in the men's 4 × 400 metres relay at the 1992 Summer Olympics.

References

1968 births
Living people
Athletes (track and field) at the 1992 Summer Olympics
Russian male sprinters
Olympic athletes of the Unified Team
Place of birth missing (living people)
Soviet Athletics Championships winners